Gekko remotus is a species of gecko. It is endemic to the Palau Islands.

References

Gekko
Reptiles described in 2012
Endemic fauna of Palau
Reptiles of Oceania